Dr. Charles Best Secondary School is a co-educational public high school located in Coquitlam, British Columbia. The school is named for Canadian physician Charles Best, one of the researchers responsible for the discovery of insulin as a treatment for diabetes. The school opened on March 22, 1971, as a junior secondary school serving students in Grades 8 through 10, and became a full secondary school (grades 9 through 12) in 2000.

In 2006, the school's main sports field was replaced with a new FieldTurf surface. The Coquitlam Metro-Ford Soccer Club of the Pacific Coast Soccer League use this as their home ground.

Programs 
In 2001, the school added a French immersion program.

Dr. Charles Best Secondary School offers a joinery program that partners with the post-secondary institution British Columbia Institute of Technology (BCIT). Grade 12 students are eligible to join the program if they are interested in becoming a Red Seal qualified joiner (cabinetmaker).

The school offers an electrical studies program that is partnered with BCIT for grade 12 students interested in becoming electricians.

Extracurricular activities

Athletics 
Dr. Charles Best Secondary school's athletic team name is the Best Blue Devils. The jersey colours are white and blue, and the mascot is a blue devil. The school sports teams are: volleyball (girls and boys), basketball (girls and boys), soccer (girls and boys), field hockey (girls only), rugby (girls and boys), badminton (co-ed) and tennis (co-ed)as well as hockey alongside Centennial Secondary. (girls and boys)

Theatre 
The student theatre group, called the Best Players, puts on two sets of plays every year.  The performances in the fall are the school's contribution to Metfest, a district-wide theatre festival of one-act plays.  The second performance is done in the spring, and it is a full length two-act play, alternating annually between a musical and a traditional play.

References

External links
 Charles Best homepage
 Charles Best library

High schools in Coquitlam
Sports venues in Coquitlam
Educational institutions established in 1971
1971 establishments in British Columbia